Broaddus Independent School District is a public school district based in Broaddus, Texas (USA). The district operates one high school, Broaddus High School.

Academic achievement
In 2009, the school district was rated "academically acceptable" by the Texas Education Agency.

Campuses
The district operates three schools.
Regular instructional
Broaddus High School (Grades 6-12
Broaddus Elementary (Grades PK-5)
Alternative instructional
Broaddus DAEP (Grades 7-12)

See also

List of school districts in Texas
List of high schools in Texas

References

External links
Broaddus ISD

School districts in San Augustine County, Texas